Trichomonas is a genus of anaerobic excavate parasites of vertebrates. It was first discovered by Alfred François Donné in 1836 when he found these parasites in the pus of a patient suffering from vaginitis, an inflammation of the vagina. Donné named the genus from its morphological characteristics. The prefix tricho- originates from the Ancient Greek word  (thrix) meaning hair, describing Trichomonas’s flagella. The suffix -monas ( – single unit), describes its similarity to unicellular organisms from the genus Monas.

Habitat and ecology
Trichomonas is typically found in anaerobic environments. It is a known parasite of many different animals including humans, birds, dogs, and cats. In humans, it can be found in the urogenital tract and in the oral cavity. It is estimated that 276 million new cases of urogenital infections occur each year. Depending on the Trichomonas species, it can either be transmitted through direct sexual contact or through contaminated water sources. In birds, it can be found in the upper digestive tract and is transmitted when adult birds regurgitate food to feed their young, when a bird of prey feeds on an infected bird, and through contaminated food or water.

Morphology
Trichomonas is around 10 µm in length and is normally pear-shaped. It has four flagella at its anterior end, distinguishing itself from closely related organisms that have different numbers of anterior flagella. At the base of these flagella are the parabasal bodies, kinetosomes accompanied by Golgi stacks. The pelta is a sheet of microtubules that curve around the flagellar bases. Posterior to the pelta is the axostyle, is a bundle of microtubules that extends from the anterior end of the organism all the way to the posterior end. The nucleus of Trichomonas is situated close to where the pelta and axostyle meet.

Another distinguishing feature of Trichomonas is the presence of an undulating membrane. The undulating membrane is a fin-like extension of the plasma membrane located on the side of the organism. A flagellum that extends to the posterior end of the organism is attached to the outer edge of the undulating membrane. At the base of the undulating membrane is a striated fiber called the costa which is thought to exist for structural support.

Trichomonas has a very interesting organelle: the hydrogenosome. Hydrogenosomes are double-membraned organelles used by trichomonads, instead of mitochondria, to produce ATP. They do not require oxygen and instead use pyruvate:ferredoxin oxido-reductase and hydrogenase to produce ATP from pyruvate, generating hydrogen gas as a by-product.

Genetics
Trichomonas vaginalis, being the species that causes the most complications in humans, is the only fully sequenced Trichomonas species. Through whole-genome shotgun sequencing, the Trichomonas vaginalis genome is estimated to be around 160 Mb long, divided into six chromosomes. However, at least 65% of its genome was found to be redundant. The redundant genetic material is hypothesized to have emerged during Trichomonass transition from aerobic to anaerobic environments.

In addition to discovering the large proportion of repetitive DNA in Trichomonas vaginalis genome, the sequenced genes were also characterized. Approximately 60,000 protein-coding genes were found. Transfer RNAs for all 20 amino acids and approximately 250 ribosomal RNA were all found on the same chromosome.

Life cycle
Trichomonas has a trophozoite form, its pear-shaped form, which is most commonly observed, and an amoeboid form, which appears during host colonization. It lacks a cyst form, but many studies have noted a unique form in which Trichomonas appears ovoidal rather than its typical pear-shaped form. In this ovoidal form, all its flagella are retracted in endocytic vacuoles, giving the impression of a cystic form. However, due to the lack of a cystic wall surrounding the organism, many studies describe this form as a pseudocystic form.

In its trophozoite form, Trichomonas undergoes cell division through an interesting process called cryptopleuromitosis'''. There are three common forms of mitosis: open, closed, and semi-open. In open mitosis, the nuclear envelope disappears so that mitotic spindles can interact with the chromosomes. In closed mitosis, the nuclear envelope does not disappear but mitotic spindles appear within the nucleus to separate the chromosomes. In semi-open mitosis, the nuclear envelope remains intact but the mitotic spindles pierce through the nuclear envelope to divide the chromosomes. Cryptopleuromitosis is different from all the other more commonly known methods of cell division. In cryptopleuromitosis, the chromosomes divide without the breakdown of the nuclear envelope and without the entry of mitotic spindles into the nucleus.

DiseasesTrichomonas causes disease in humans and in birds. In humans, the causative species is Trichomonas vaginalis and Trichomonas tenax. In birds, the causative species are Trichomonas gallinae, Trichomonas gypactinii, and Trichomonas stableri.

In humansTrichomonas vaginalis is a sexually transmitted disease and causes trichomoniasis. It resides on squamous epithelium of the urogenital tract. Many carriers of Trichomonas vaginalis, especially men, are asymptomatic. Complications for symptomatic women include vaginitis, endometritis, infertility, and cervical cancer. Complications for symptomatic men include urethritis, prostatitis, epididymitis, and infertility. It is also associated with increased risk of transmission and acquisition of HIV.Trichomonas tenax is transmitted through exchange of saliva and contaminated water sources. It is an opportunistic pathogen and may cause pulmonary trichomoniasis.

In birdsTrichomonas in birds inhabit the upper digestive tract and also cause trichomoniasis. It creates lesions in the trachea and esophagus, occupying space and eventually causing emaciation and asphyxiation.

Species
 Trichomonas brixi — inhabits the oral cavity of dogs and cats.
 Trichomonas gallinae — inhabits the upper digestive tract of primarily pigeons and doves, but also other birds.
 Trichomonas gypactinii — inhabits the upper digestive tract of scavenging birds of prey, such as vultures.
 Trichomonas stableri — inhabits the upper digestive tract of pigeons.
 Trichomonas tenax — inhabits the oral cavity of humans.
 Trichomonas vaginalis'' — inhabits the urogenital tract of humans.

References

 

Metamonads
Excavata genera